This page shows the results of leadership elections in the Saskatchewan Party. The elections are by One member, one vote.

1998 leadership convention 

(Held on April 20, 1998)

2004 leadership convention

(Held on July 15, 2004)

Brad Wall acclaimed

2018 leadership election

(Held on January 27, 2018)
 = Eliminated from next round
 = Winner

See also
Leadership convention
Saskatchewan Party

References 

Political party leadership elections in Saskatchewan